Paige is an unincorporated community in Bastrop County, Texas, United States. Paige has a post office with the ZIP code 78659.

Namesake
Paige, Texas was named after Paige Broderick, a civil engineer who planned the route of Houston and Texas Central Railway.

History
Paige was created in 1872 near the Houston and Texas Central Railway. The post office of Paige was created in 1874, and in 1876, the railway station near the town was moved three miles east to the location of the current station. In 1877, Fedor Soder arrived in the town and sold many town lots to Germans. He also created a store and a cotton gin, as the town was growing due to massive production of cotton in the area. The population of Paige in 1884 was about 350 citizens, and it jumped to 500 in 1886. By that time, the town had several businesses, a broom factory, a creamery, a pickle factory, and seven cotton gins. The town was a large shipping joint for butter, cattle, cordwood, cotton, eggs, hogs, potatoes, and many other items. The town gained a bank and telephone service in 1914, but the population slightly decreased up till the 1960s or 1970s.

Geography
Paige is located 44 miles east of Austin. Its coordinate location is 30.2102146, −97.1149872. The town is on U.S. Highway 290.

Education
The Paige community is within the Bastrop Independent School District. Students attend Emile Elementary School (in the former Emile School), Bastrop Intermediate School, Bastrop Middle School, and Bastrop High School.

References

External links

 Paige at the Handbook of Texas Online
 

Unincorporated communities in Bastrop County, Texas
Unincorporated communities in Texas
Greater Austin